VER-3323 is a drug which acts as a selective agonist for both the 5-HT2B and 5-HT2C serotonin receptor subtypes, with moderate selectivity for 5-HT2C, but relatively low affinity for 5-HT2A. It has potent anorectic effects in animal studies.

See also
 AL-34662
 AL-38022A
 Ro60-0175
 YM-348

References

5-HT2B agonists
Serotonin receptor agonists
Indolines
Bromoarenes